This page is a list of the grand masters of the Order of Santiago.

 Pedro Fernández de Castro (1170–1184)
 Fernando Díaz (1184–1186)
 Sancho Fernández de Lemos (1186–1195). Killed in the battle of Alarcos.
 Gonzalo Rodríguez (1195–1204)
 Suero Rodríguez (1204–1206)
 Fernando González de Marañón (1206–1210)
 Pedro Arias (1210–1212). Died of his wounds, following the Battle of Las Navas de Tolosa.
 García González de Arauzo (1212–1217)
 Martín Peláez Barragán (1217–1221)
 García González de Candamio (1221–1224)
 Fernán Pérez Chacín (1224–1225)
 Pedro Alfonso de León (1225–1226). Supposed to be the illegitimate son of Alfonso IX of León.
 Pedro González Mengo (1226–1237)
 Rodrigo Íñiguez (o Yáñez) (1237–1242)
 Paio Peres Correia (1242–1275)
 Gonzalo Ruiz Girón (1275–1280). Died of wounds received at the disastrous Battle of Moclín.
 Pedro Núñez (1280–1286)
 Gonzalo Martel (1286)
 Pedro Fernández Mata (1286–1293)
 Juan Osórez (1293–1311)
 Diego Muñiz (1311–1318)
 García Fernández (1318–1327)
 Vasco Rodríguez de Coronado (1327–1338)
 Vasco López (1338)
 Alonso Meléndez de Guzmán (1338–1342)
 Fadrique Alfonso de Castilla (1342–1358)
 Garci Álvarez de Toledo y Meneses (1359–1366)
 Gonzalo Mejía de Virués (1366–1371)
 Fernando Osórez (1371–1383)
 Pedro Fernández Cabeza de Vaca (1383–1384). Killed in the Siege of Lisbon.
 Rodrigo González Mejía (1384). Killed in the Siege of Lisbon.
 Pedro Muñiz de Godoy y Sandoval (1384–1385). Killed in the Battle of Valverde.
 García Fernández de Villagarcía (1385–1387)
 Lorenzo I Suárez de Figueroa (Grand Master of Santiago) (1387–1409)
 Enrique de Aragón (1409–1445)
 Álvaro de Luna (1445–1453)
 Juan II (1453) Administrator
 Enrique IV de Castilla (1453–1462) Administrator
 Beltrán de la Cueva (1462–1463)
 Alfonso de Castilla (1463–1467)
 Juan Pacheco (1467–1474)
 Alonso de Cárdenas (1474–1476 in Kingdom of León) (first time)
 Rodrigo Manrique de Lara (1474–1476 in kingdom of Castile)
 Fernando el Católico (1476–1477) Administrator
 Alonso de Cárdenas (1477–1493) (second time)
 Reyes Católicos (1493–...) Administrators. Final incorporation into the Crown of Spain under the reign of Charles I of Spain

Notes

References

Sources

Order of Santiago
Order of Santiago
Santiago